Baburka is a village (a selo) in the Zaporizhzhia Raion (district) of Zaporizhzhia Oblast in southern Ukraine. Its population was 362 in the 2001 Ukrainian Census.

History
The settlement was first founded in 1785 as Burwalde by German-speaking Mennonites settling the Chortitza Colony. Administratively, it belongs to the Dolynske Rural Council, a local government area. It is located south of the Khortytskyi District of the city of Zaporizhzhia, the oblast's administrative center.

See also
 History of German settlement in Central and Eastern Europe

References

Populated places established in 1785
Former German settlements in Zaporizhzhia Oblast

Zaporizhzhia Raion
Villages in Zaporizhzhia Raion